Nikolay Vasilyev (born 12 April 1956) is a Soviet hurdler. He competed in the men's 400 metres hurdles at the 1980 Summer Olympics.

References

1956 births
Living people
Athletes (track and field) at the 1980 Summer Olympics
Soviet male hurdlers
Olympic athletes of the Soviet Union
Place of birth missing (living people)